China's Unnatural Disaster: The Tears of Sichuan Province is a 2009 documentary film co-directed by Jon Alpert and Matthew O'Neill of the Downtown Community Television Center, and produced by MZ Pictures for HBO Films.

The documentary covers the aftermath of the 2008 Sichuan earthquake on May 12, which killed around 70,000 people—of which 10,000 were children, many of whom were killed when their schools collapsed. The film focuses on the grieving families and communities of the children as they mourn their loss and question the government over the construction standard of the schools.

Alpert and O'Neill sent the raw footage of the film by courier to the United States, before they were detained and questioned by local police for eight hours as they tried to leave the country themselves. In September 2009, the filmmakers were scheduled to present the film at the Shanghai International Film Festival, but were denied visas by the Chinese government.

China's Unnatural Disaster was nominated for the Academy Award for Best Documentary (Short Subject) in 2009.

References

External links

China's Unnatural Disaster: The Tears of Sichuan Province at the Downtown Community Television Center

2009 television films
2009 films
HBO documentary films
Documentary films about China
Films shot in China
2008 Sichuan earthquake
Documentary films about earthquakes
Films set in Sichuan
Sichuanese-language films
2000s American films